Oxytocin/ergometrine (trade name Syntometrine) is an obstetric combination drug. The components are synthetically produced oxytocin, a human hormone produced in the hypothalamus, and ergometrine, an alpha-adrenergic, dopaminergic and serotonin (5-HT2) receptor agonist.

Both substances cause the uterus to contract. An injection of Syntometrine is given in the third stage of labor, just after the birth of the child to facilitate delivery of the placenta and to prevent postpartum hemorrhage by causing smooth muscle tissue in the blood vessel walls to narrow, thereby reducing blood flow.

Contraindications 

Syntometrine should not be used in patients with:

 Allergy to one or any of its ingredients
 First stage of labor
 Second stage of labor before crowning of the baby's head
 Severe kidney disorders
 Severe liver disorders
 Severe heart disorders
 Vascular diseases
 Severe hypertension
 Pre-eclampsia or eclampsia
 Sepsis

It should be used with caution in patients with:

 Decreased kidney function
 Decreased liver function
 Mild heart disease
 Mild hypertension
 Porphyria

Side effects 

Possible side effects include:

 Nausea and vomiting
 Abdominal pain, feeling different than labor pains
 Headache
 Dizziness
 Skin rashes, itching or hives
 Swelling of face, lips, tongue or other body parts
 Hypertension
 Arrhythmias (abnormal heart beats)
 Chest pain
 Fall in blood pressure (causing dizziness and lightheadedness)
 Difficulty in breathing
 Circulatory shock

A health care provider should be notified immediately if there are any side effects. They may be signs of allergy or of too much fluid associated with high doses or long
infusions.

Drug interactions 

Prostaglandins increase the effect of oxytocin and vice versa. The contractions should be carefully monitored if oxytocin is given after a prostaglandin dose.

Syntometrine may enhance the blood pressure raising effect of vasoconstrictors (medicines given to constrict the blood vessels).

Some inhaled anaesthetics used for general anesthesia, such as cyclopropane and halothane, may reduce the effect of oxytocin and ergometrine. There may also be an increased risk of a drop in blood pressure and abnormal heart beats if oxytocin is given with these general anesthetics.

References 

Obstetric drugs
Combination drugs